Kingston upon Thames in South West London, England is served by two bus stations as well as a large number of on-street bus stops. Due to the Kingston one-way system, the various stops and bus stations are physically separate, however passengers are able to interchange between routes by walking through Kingston town centre, or walking from Kingston railway station.

Kingston bus stations

Cromwell Road bus station
Kingston Cromwell Road bus station located close to Kingston railway station. It opened in July 1995, on the site of an old coal yard. Built to replace a 70 year old facility, the bus station was opened as part of the Kingston Relief Road project, which involved the main shopping streets in Kingston town centre being pedestrianised, and a new one-way system being built around the town centre for traffic. It was designed by in-house London Transport architect Robert Stevenson, and won a Townscape Award from the Kingston upon Thames Society.

The station comprises 12 bus stands, with 5 street stops - making it the largest London Buses station in London. The station is owned and maintained by Transport for London. Over 8 million passengers use the bus station every year.

In 2013, TfL announced that the bus station could be rebuilt, as several bus routes no longer terminate at Cromwell Road or Fairfield bus stations owing to lack of capacity. In 2015, planning permission was approved for the demolition of the bus station, and the building of a replacement on the same site.

London Buses routes 57, 65, 71, 85, 111, 131, 213, 216, 281, 285, 371, 406, 411, 418, 465, 481, 671, K1, K2, K3, K4, K5, X26 and night routes N87 and N65 serve the station. A number of non-TfL buses also serve the station, with destinations outside Greater London in Surrey.

Fairfield bus station
Kingston Fairfield bus station is located east of the town centre, on the former site of the Kingston cattle market. The bus station opened in 1987, as part of the first phase of the Kingston Relief Road project. Named after the nearby Fairfield Recreation Ground, the bus station was initially known as Cattlemarket Bus Station. The bus station sits above an underground multi-storey car park that serves the Kingfisher Leisure Centre, recreation ground and Kingston town centre. Over 2 million passengers use the bus station every year.

London Buses routes 57, 131, 213, K3, K5 and night routes N87 serve the station.

Historic bus stations
A bus garage was opened on Cromwell Road by the London General Omnibus Company in 1922. In 1928, an extension added a covered bus stand, known as Kingston bus station. The site was too small to be used as both a bus garage and a bus station, and the bus garage closed in 1984 to allow for more space for the bus station. Following the opening of Cromwell Road bus station in 1995, the site was then used for overnight storage of buses. After over 70 years, the site closed on 17 May 2000 as London United moved to Tolworth bus garage. The site was rebuilt as the Rotunda complex, with an Odeon Cinema, restaurants and tenpin bowling.

As part of the rebuild of Kingston railway station by the Southern Railway in 1935, a bus lay-by was provided outside the station, in which various bus routes terminated. Following opening of the Fairfield bus station, the lay-by was subsequently used as a taxi rank.

See also
 List of bus and coach stations in London

References

Transport in the Royal Borough of Kingston upon Thames
Buildings and structures in the Royal Borough of Kingston upon Thames
Bus stations in London